NGC 1351 is an elliptical galaxy in the constellation Fornax. Based on the redshift, its distance from Earth is 69.5 million light years. It is elongated in shape, and was discovered by William Herschel on October 19, 1835.

The diameter of the galaxy is 60,000 light years, which makes it a medium-size galaxy, and smaller than the Milky Way Galaxy. It is a member of the Fornax Cluster, a cluster of approximately 200 galaxies.

See also 
NGC 1399
NGC 1365

References

Elliptical galaxies
013028
Fornax (constellation)
1351